The Iglesia de San Francisco de Asís (Church of St. Francis of Assisi) is a Catholic church located in the city of Santa Cruz de Tenerife (Canary Islands, Spain).

This church was originally a Franciscan convent and is now the second most important church of the city, after the Church of the Conception. The present church was completed in 1680 and notable for the large number of works of art he owns. The church has three naves and is one of the best examples of Baroque architecture in the Canary Islands.

Although the church is most famous because it is home to the miraculous image of the Señor de las Tribulaciones, a small picture that represents Jesus Christ, which is famous because after a cholera epidemic and morbidity in 1893, we made a procession with this image through the streets of the city and the epidemic stopped miraculously. For this reason the size is invoked as protector of the city and taking the title of Señor de Santa Cruz.

Gallery

References

External links 
Parish website

Catholic Church in the Canary Islands
Buildings and structures in Santa Cruz de Tenerife
Churches in Tenerife
Bien de Interés Cultural landmarks in the Province of Santa Cruz de Tenerife